The Islamic Azad University, Tabriz Branch (IAUT) (Dāneshgāh-e Āzād-e Eslāmi-e Tabriz) is a branch of Islamic Azad University of Iran in the city of Tabriz. The university rankings conducted by Islamic World Science Citation Database, have gained in the years 2010 and 2011 ranked first among all Islamic Azad universities.

Some of the achievements and honors of Tabriz branch:

 Standing on the 4th place among nearly 400 branches of the Islamic Azad University and on the 41st place  among all universities in Iran based on the report of Scimago institutions ranking
 Standing on the 2nd place in the international competitions of settling pilgrims of Baitullah al-haram in Saudi Arabia
 Standing on the 1st place in designing the entrance door head of Iran national botanic garden
 Establishing the first young researchers’ club of the IAU in Iran
 Standing on the 2nd place in the international concrete cube competitions of the USA
 Winning a silver medal in the 18th festival of inventions and innovations held by Malaysian Ministry of sciences
 Standing on the 3rd place in the 7th international competitions of modern inventions and technologies in Croatia
 Winning a gold medal by one of the students of Tabriz Islamic Azad University (Ali Bahari) in the Switzerland international competitions
 Winning two gold medals, a statue, and honors diploma of the world female inventors by a member of  Tabriz young researchers’ club among 200 countries in the South Korea
 Winning the award of Scopus 2014 of Elsevier institute by Dr Mohammadali Behnezhadi  an academic member of Tabriz Islamic Azad University, as the Iranian young scientist
 >Winning a gold medal and a silver one in the 12th international festival of inventions in Zagreb – Croatia by the students of Tabriz Islamic Azad University
 Introducing Dr Mohammadali Behnezhadi and Dr Naser Modirshahla, two academic members of  Tabriz Islamic Azad University, as the international scientists according to the latest report of the ESI institute affiliated to Thomson Reuters (ISI) regarding world scientists’ ranking, within the period of Jan. 1, 2004 to Dec. 30,2014

Gallery

References

External links 
 Official web site of IAUT 

Tabriz 
Education in Tabriz
Educational institutions established in 1982
Buildings and structures in Tabriz
1982 establishments in Iran